Haizhou District is one of three urban districts of Lianyungang, Jiangsu province, China.

Xinpu District was a former district of Lianyungang, Jiangsu province, China. Now, it's merged into Haizhou District.

Administrative divisions
In the present, Haizhou District (including the former Xinpu District which was merged into Haizhou District) has 10 subdistricts, 5 towns and 3 township. 
Old Haizhou District has 4 subdistricts, 3 towns and 1 township
Former Xinpu District has 6 subdistricts, 2 towns and 2 township

10 subdistricts
-Old Haizhou District

-Former Xinpu District

5 towns
-Old Haizhou District
 Xinba
 Jinping
 Banpu

-Former Xinpu District
 Nancheng
 Punan

3 township
-Old Haizhou District
 Ninghai

-Former Xinpu District
 Yuntai
 Huaguoshan

References 

www.xzqh.org

External links

County-level divisions of Jiangsu
Lianyungang